Inside My Brain is the debut extended play by the American punk rock band Angry Samoans, released in 1980 by Bad Trip Records. The most infamous song on the EP, "Get Off the Air", was directed at influential KROQ-FM DJ Rodney Bingenheimer.

Track listing
 "Right Side of My Mind" - 2:09
 "Gimme Sopor" - 1:44
 "Hot Cars" - 0:33
 "Inside My Brain" - 1:36
 "You Stupid Asshole" - 2:09
 "Get Off the Air" - 1:28

Reissue on PVC Records and Triple X Records
 "Right Side of My Mind" - 2:09
 "Gimme Sopor" - 1:44
 "Hot Cars" - 0:33
 "Inside My Brain" - 1:36
 "You Stupid Asshole" - 2:09
 "Get Off the Air" - 1:28
 "My Old Man's a Fatso" (demo, recorded October 1978) - 2:55
 "Carson Girls" (demo, recorded October 1978) - 2:48
 "I'm a Pig" (demo, recorded October 1978) - 2:17
 "Too Animalistic" (live at Rhino Records, May 12, 1979) - 1:59
 "Right Side of My Mind" (live at Rhino Records, May 12, 1979) - 2:16

Personnel
 "Metal Mike" Saunders - vocals, guitar
 Gregg Turner - vocals, guitar (tracks 1-6)
 P.J. Galligan - first guitar (tracks 1-6)
 Bonze Blayk f/k/a "Kevin Saunders" – lead guitar (tracks 7-11)
 Todd Homer - bass guitar, vocals
 Bill Vockeroth - drums

References

External links
 DaRonco, Mike. "Inside My Brain Review by Mike DaRonco". allmusic.com. Retrieved May 30, 2015.

1980 debut EPs
Angry Samoans albums
Bad Trip Records EPs
Triple X Records EPs